HMS Blast was a  of the Royal Navy, one of ten such vessels commissioned in 1695 to support land assaults on continental ports. Over a 30-year period she saw service in the fleets of Admirals Berkeley and Byng and took part in the British victory at the Battle of Cape Passaro in 1718.

In 1721 she was converted to a storeship in British-controlled Port Mahón, and was broken up there in 1724.

References

Bibliography

Further reading

1690s ships
Ships built by the Blackwall Yard
Bomb vessels of the Royal Navy